Carlton K. Mack,  (July 30, 1911, Heshan, Guangdong – April 1995) born Mack Chuck Kwong, was a Chinese businessman who moved to Trinidad and Tobago at a young age where he built the J.T. Allum & Co. business into one of Trinidad and Tobago's largest enterprises.

See also
 Chinese Trinidadian and Tobagonian
 JTA Supermarkets

References 

1911 births
1995 deaths
Chinese emigrants to Trinidad and Tobago
20th-century Trinidad and Tobago businesspeople